Max Mirnyi and Andrei Olhovskiy were the defending champions, but did not participate this year.

Simon Aspelin and Johan Landsberg won the title, defeating Juan Ignacio Carrasco and Jairo Velasco Jr. 7–6(7–2), 6–4 in the final.

Seeds

Draw

Draw

External links
 2000 Open 13 Doubles draw

Open 13
2000 ATP Tour